Malo Polje is a small settlement in the hills northeast of Col in the Municipality of Ajdovščina in the Littoral region of Slovenia.

References

External links 
Malo Polje at Geopedia

Populated places in the Municipality of Ajdovščina